The East Africa Premier League (EAPL) was a 20-over competition covering Kenya and Uganda. The EAPL was founded in 2011, together with the East Africa Cup, in the wake of Kenya's disastrous performance in the 2011 Cricket World Cup. It comprised four Kenyan provincial franchises as well as two teams from Uganda that play each over in a league, culminating in a final between the team that finished top of the league and the winner of a series of playoff matches. Its main objective was to improve the standard of cricket played in Kenya, and spark a revival on the international stage once again.

Tournament History
The tournament was started in the wake of Kenya's disastrous 2011 Cricket World Cup campaign. Its main aim was to develop the standard of cricket both in Kenya and Uganda. This idea was first believed to be mooted by then Cricket Kenya CEO Tom Sears. The idea had been set out by Robert Kisubi and Colin Macbeth in 2010 after Uganda's Intercontinental Shield draw with UAE in Abu Dhabi. The blueprint proposed four-day games comprising five franchises (three Kenyan, two Ugandan) with a 50-over match tacked on. The aim was to improve the East Africans' long game. Kenya's disaster in Dubai condensed the scope of the idea, which Sears took up, ran with and called his 'brainchild'.

2011–12 season

The inaugural season was dominated by the two Ugandan franchises with Nile Knights defeating Rwenzori Warriors in a final that had to be postponed severally due to weather and scheduling difficulties

2012 season

In the second season, the Kenyan franchises, especially Coast Pekee showed a marked improvement; however the final was still won by the Ugandan team Ruwenzori Warriors

2013 season

Saw an overhaul to the tournament with Kenyan corporates taking over the Kenyan franchises. The tournament was also compressed to less than one week from one month. Newly created Rising Stars Chuis defeated Ruwenzori Warriors in the final.

Franchises
Four Teams from Kenya plus two teams from Uganda took part in the tournament. They were as follows:-

2012–13 Squads

Rising Stars Chui:
Collins Obuya (c), Harrison Angila, Boniface Anjere, Imran Nazir, Kamran Akmal (wk), Irfan Karim, Rajesh Khetiya, Alfred Luseno, David Maina, Martin Mworia, Martin Okoth, Joseph Owino, Kirtan Patel, Henry Rudd, Vishal Shikotra, Subham Patel, Tarandeep Singh, Hiren Varaiya

Express Ndovu
Rakep Patel (c), Gautam Bhudia, Kavi Dosaja, Gurdeep Singh, Imran Nazir, Ikreeth Kenth, Peter Kituku, Peter Koech, Maninder Singh, Mohammad Sami, Nikul Patel, Lucas Oluoch, Paresh Gami, Abdul Rehman, Mitesh Sanghani, Paramveer Singh, Abraham Vadada, Dominic Wesonga

I & M Bank Nyati
Tanmay Mishra (c), Josephat Ababu, Abdulqadir Najmi, Ibrahim Akello, Nick Oluoch, Hamza Malik (wk), Jimmy Kamande, Karan Kaul, Krutarth Rao, James Ngoche, Alex Obanda, Elijah Otieno, Emmanuel Bundi, Willam Rudd, Raj Savala, Waqas Aslam

Sameer Simba
Morris Ouma (c), Stephen Biko, Dhiren Gondaria, Bhargab Goswami, Nadeem Ahmed, Shem Ngoche, Eugene Ochieng, Nelson Odhiambo, Kennedy Owino, Harsh Patel, Narendra Kalyan, Gagandeep Singh, Gurmanjot Singh, Taaha Sulemanjee, Siddhant Taneja, Bhavya Thaker

Nile Knights
Davis Arinaitwe (c), Hamza Almuzahim, Asadu Seiga, Nicholas Kebba, Arthur Kyobe, Deusdedit Muhumuza, Benjamin Musoke, Frank Nsubuga, Faruk Ochimi, Jackson Ogwang, Richard Okia, Raymond Otim, Danniel Ruyange, Ivan Thawithemwira, Arthur Ziraba 	

Rwenzori Warriors
Lawrence Sematimba (c), Abdulah Lubega, Hamu Bagenda, Fred Isabirye, Jeremy Kibukamusoke, Brian Masaba, Mohammed Akmal, Roger Mukasa, Naeem Bardai, Martin Ondeko, Arnold Otwan, Jonathan Ssebanja, Shamu Mukaaya, Abu Sseguya, Henry Ssenyondo, Charles Waiswa

Broadcasting Rights
Initially, SuperSport became the broadcast partner for Cricket Kenya, and was broadcast the inaugural East African competitions which was a big boost for the tournament. Following the success of the inaugural tournaments, SuperSport extended their deal with the board to another two years to broadcast the tournament till 2013.

Results

References

Kenyan domestic cricket competitions
Cricket in Uganda
Twenty20 cricket leagues
Professional cricket leagues
Multi-national professional sports leagues